Poulan is a city in Worth County, Georgia, United States. The population was 851 at the 2010 and 765 (2019) census.

Poulan is part of the Albany, Georgia Metropolitan Statistical Area.

Poulan is notable for its police department's speed trap tactics from 2006 to 2012. In 2009 Poulan's small police force generated nearly $900,000 from fines and fees, a number comparable to a city 30 times its size and due to the charges and fees being more than most cities. The per capita revenue from fines and fees is $1,019.15.

History
The Georgia General Assembly incorporated Poulan as a town in 1889. The city was named for Judge W.A. Poulan.

Geography

Poulan is located at  (31.513739, -83.791041).

According to the United States Census Bureau, the city has a total area of 1.7 square miles (4.3 km), all land.

Demographics

As of the census of 2000, there were 946 people, 365 households, and 273 families residing in the city. The racial makeup of the city was 76.22% White, 21.99% African American, 0.42% Native American, 0.11% Asian, 0.53% from other races, and 0.74% from two or more races. Hispanic or Latino of any race were 0.74% of the population.

There were 365 households, out of which 35.9% had children under the age of 18 living with them, 52.3% were married couples living together, 15.3% had a female householder with no husband present, and 25.2% were non-families. 23.6% of all households were made up of individuals, and 9.9% had someone living alone who was 65 years of age or older.  The average household size was 2.59 and the average family size was 3.00.

In the city, the population was spread out, with 26.5% under the age of 18, 9.0% from 18 to 24, 28.0% from 25 to 44, 24.6% from 45 to 64, and 11.8% who were 65 years of age or older.  The median age was 37 years. For every 100 females, there were 97.5 males.  For every 100 females age 18 and over, there were 87.3 males.

The median income for a household in the city was $27,708, and the median income for a family was $35,208. Males had a median income of $30,000 versus $21,250 for females. The per capita income for the city was $13,439.  About 16.8% of families and 20.9% of the population were below the poverty line, including 21.8% of those under age 18 and 16.9% of those age 65 or over.

Notable people
 Howell T. Heflin, who became a U.S. Senator from Alabama, was born in Poulan in 1921. At that time Heflin's father was serving as a Methodist minister in Poulan. The Heflin family remained there for only a short time before returning to their native Alabama.
 Chase Osborn was Governor of Michigan from 1911-1913. He resided at Possum Poke in Poulan and died there in 1949.

References

External links
 Worth County, Georgia
 Possum Poke

Cities in Georgia (U.S. state)
Cities in Worth County, Georgia
Albany metropolitan area, Georgia